The 2002 Bulldogs RLFC season was the 68th in the club's history. Coached by Steve Folkes and captained by Steve Price, they competed in the National Rugby League's 2002 Telstra Premiership, finishing the regular season at the bottom of the ladder due to punishment for breaches of the NRL's strictly-enforced salary cap. The discovery of these breaches resulted in then-unprecedented penalties being inflicted upon the Sydney-based club, none more so than the 37 competition points gained from the 2002 season docked from them and the demotion of the club from first to last place with three rounds remaining in the season. In addition to those penalties, the club was fined a then-record $500,000. The League's top try scorer for the season was Nigel Vagana with 23 and the top points scorer was Hazem El Masri with 254 - both Bulldogs players.

Salary cap breach
The Bulldogs fallout from a disappointing 2000 season saw a "new breed" of players coming through for 2001. The Bulldogs' outfit aged badly in 2000 with many players past their best and a massive cleanout happened with several new players on the way including Nigel Vagana, Luke Patten, Brett Howland and Darrell Trindall. The Bulldogs finished the Minor Premiership in second position but crashed out of the Finals. The Dally M Rookie of the Year that season was Braith Anasta. Mark O'Meley was signed up for the 2002 season as the club said farewell to captain Darren Britt and his deputy Craig Polla-Mounter. With both of those gone, Steve Folkes opted for Steve Price as captain ahead of the more experienced Darren Smith.

In mid-2002, the Bulldogs were found guilty of serious and systemic breaches of the salary cap. NRL Chief Executive David Gallop described the violation as "exceptional in both its size and its deliberate and ongoing nature". The club received the maximum fine of $500,000, and was stripped of all 37 competition points. The latter action was particularly harmful, as the club were poised to take the Minor Premiership and had won 17 consecutive matches (the second highest in Australian club rugby league history at the time); the penalty meant that the club would win the wooden spoon. Fans of the club had gone from the joy of a last-minute win over Newcastle just two weeks prior to the pain, anguish and realisation that the club would not be participating in the 2002 finals.

The stripping of the Bulldogs' points also enabled the Canberra Raiders to make the finals with a points differential of -170, the poorest such record of any finalist in the competition's history, and despite the fact that the Raiders only won one game outside of Canberra for the entire season. It also enabled the New Zealand Warriors to secure their first minor premiership in the club's history.

An extensive NRL investigation resulted in two senior club officials being charged with fraud, theft and forgery by the NSW Police; both pleaded guilty and were sentenced to nine years jail with a non-parole period of seven years, and were suspended from the NRL for life.

Club legend Steve Mortimer was brought in to save the club, and the Bulldogs then finished one game short of the Grand Final in 2003.

Ladder
The Warriors received A$100,000 prize money for finishing the regular season as minor premiers.

See also

History of the Canterbury-Bankstown Bulldogs
List of Canterbury-Bankstown Bulldogs seasons

References

External links
Full coverage of the Bulldogs salary cap breach from The Sydney Morning Herald

Canterbury-Bankstown Bulldogs seasons
Bulldogs RLFC